Pournoy may refer to two communes in the Moselle department in north-eastern France:
 Pournoy-la-Chétive
 Pournoy-la-Grasse